Trashing the Planet: How Science Can Help Us Deal With Acid Rain, Depletion of the Ozone, and Nuclear Waste (Among Other Things) is a 1990 book by zoologist and Governor of Washington Dixy Lee Ray. The book talks about the seriousness about acid rain, the problems with the ozone layer and other environmental issues. Ray co-wrote the book with journalist Lou Guzzo.

References

External links 

 

1990 non-fiction books
English-language books
Regnery Publishing books
Environmentally skeptical books
Books about nuclear issues